Thomas Marcelle (born February 8, 1962) is an American attorney and judge from New York. He has served as a judge of the Cohoes, New York City Court since 2016. Marcelle previously served as Albany County Attorney. In 2001, Marcelle argued and won  Good News Club v. Milford Central School, a case before the U.S. Supreme Court.

Marcelle has been nominated three times to be a judge of the United States District Court for the Northern District of New York. The first two nominations expired, and the third was withdrawn by President Donald Trump at Marcelle's request due to opposition from U.S. Senator Kirsten Gillibrand.

Education 

Marcelle received his Bachelor of Arts from Bowdoin College and his Juris Doctor, magna cum laude, from Cornell Law School, where he served on the Cornell Law Review.

Legal career 

In 1990, Marcelle served as a trial attorney at the United States Department of Justice. In that role, he worked on cases involving the Civil Rights of Institutionalized Persons Act. He has also served as a public defender, working under Doug Rutnik (the father of U.S. Senator Kirsten Gillibrand).

Marcelle ran for Albany County District Attorney as a Republican in 1993. His bid to unseat incumbent Sol Greenberg was unsuccessful.

Marcelle was legal counsel to the Republican minority in the Albany County Legislature from 2002 to 2011. He has also served as senior counsel at Alliance Defending Freedom, known at the time as the Alliance Defense Fund.

In 2012, Democratic Albany County Executive Dan McCoy nominated Marcelle to the position of Albany County Attorney. The nomination met with "vocal condemnation from quarters of the county's LGBT, labor and progressive Democratic communities". Opponents of the nomination launched a website calling for legislators to vote against Marcelle, decrying his work with Alliance Defending Freedom. On February 13, 2012, the Albany County Legislature voted, 27–10, to confirm Marcelle's nomination.

In 2016, Marcelle took a position as Counsel to the Albany County Sheriff. Later that year, he left that position for a newly created job as a youth diversion activities coordinator. Marcelle made this move after having asked the state's Advisory Committee on Judicial Ethics whether his work with the Sheriff's Office created a conflict of interest with his part-time judgeship on the Cohoes City Court. The Committee found that holding both jobs would create an "appearance of impropriety".

As of 2018, Marcelle was a member of the New York Conservative Party. He is a former Republican. He has been a member of the Federalist Society since 1990.

Appearance before the U.S. Supreme Court 

In 2001, Marcelle argued and won a case before the U.S. Supreme Court. In that case, Good News Club v. Milford Central School, 533 U.S. 98 (2001), Marcelle represented a Good News Club in Otsego, New York. The Good News Club sought to allow elementary school students the right to meet after school in a public school building for Bible study and prayer. The Court ruled, 6–3, in favor of the Good News Club.

Judicial career

Failed federal district court nomination by George W. Bush 

On July 31, 2008, President George W. Bush nominated Marcelle to be a United States District Judge for the Northern District of New York.  The nomination was not acted upon due to opposition from U.S. Senator Charles Schumer of New York, who withheld a blue slip consenting to the nomination. The nomination expired at the end of Bush's term.

State court service 

In 2016, Marcelle was nominated as a judge of the Cohoes City Court by then-Mayor Shawn Morse. Marcelle has served in that capacity since 2016.

Failed federal district court nominations by Donald Trump 

Marcelle was recommended as a federal court nominee in 2018 by Congressmen John Faso and Lee Zeldin. On October 10, 2018, President Donald Trump announced his intent to nominate Marcelle to serve as a Judge of the United States District Court for the Northern District of New York. Marcelle was nominated to the seat vacated by Judge Gary L. Sharpe, who took senior status on January 1, 2016. On November 13, 2018, his nomination was sent to the U.S. Senate.

On January 3, 2019, Marcelle's nomination was returned to the President under Rule XXXI, Paragraph 6 of the United States Senate. On January 23, 2019, President Trump announced that he had renominated Marcelle. Also on January 23, 2019, the American Bar Association unanimously rated Marcelle "well qualified"--its highest rating--for the judgeship. On August 29, 2019, the Albany Times Union reported that Marcelle had withdrawn his name from consideration "after his nomination was blocked by U.S. Sen. Kirsten Gillibrand over his opposition to abortion". The White House officially withdrew his nomination on September 19, 2019.

Personal life 

Marcelle is a native of South Bethlehem, New York. His late father, Alfonso "Doc" Marcelle, headed Callanan Industries, a local highway construction firm.

Marcelle and his wife, Elena, have three children and reside in Slingerlands, New York.

See also 
 Donald Trump judicial appointment controversies

References

External links 
 Appearances at the U.S. Supreme Court from the Oyez Project

1962 births
Living people
20th-century American lawyers
21st-century American lawyers
21st-century American judges
Bowdoin College alumni
Cornell Law School alumni
Federalist Society members
Lawyers from Albany, New York
New York (state) state court judges
Public defenders
United States Department of Justice lawyers